Gorytvesica fustigera is a species of moth of the family Tortricidae. It is found in Napo Province, Ecuador.

The wingspan is 18.5 mm. The colouration of the forewings and shape of the white lines are as in
Gorytvesica argentilinea. The hindwings are cream grey.

Etymology
The species name refers to the shape of the uncus and is derived from Latin fustis (meaning club) and gerere (meaning to carry).

References

Moths described in 2005
Euliini
Moths of South America
Taxa named by Józef Razowski